This is a list of episodes from the third season of Happy Days.  It was the first season of the show to be filmed in front of a live audience.

Main cast
 Ron Howard as Richie Cunningham
 Henry Winkler as Arthur "Fonzie" Fonzarelli
 Marion Ross as Marion Cunningham
 Anson Williams as Warren "Potsie" Weber
 Don Most as Ralph Malph 
 Erin Moran as Joanie Cunningham
 Tom Bosley as Howard Cunningham

Guest stars 
 Pat Morita as Mitsumo "Arnold" Takahashi 
Danny Butch as Raymond "Spike" Fonzarelli
 Jack Baker as "Sticks" Downey
 Penny Marshall as Laverne De Fazio 
 Cindy Williams as Shirley Feeney
 Jack Dodson as Dr. Mickey Malph
 Ed Peck as Officer Kirk
 Kristoff St. John as Booker Brown 
 Beatrice Colen as Marsha Simms
 Hal Smith as incarcerated drunk in cell

Broadcast history
The season aired Tuesdays at 8:00-8:30 pm (EST).

Episodes

References

Happy Days 03
1975 American television seasons
1976 American television seasons